On 1 November 1988, Tongil Sports Co., Ltd. announced the organization of Ilhwa Chunma Football Club and chose Dongdaemun Stadium in Seoul as its home stadium. Then on 18 March 1989, 108 days after the announcement, the organizing ceremony was held at the Sheraton Walkerhill Hotel in Seoul.
Ilhwa Chunma participated in its first season as the 6th professional football team of Korean Professional Football League.

Staff

Coaching staff 
Manager :  Park Jong-Hwan
Coach :  Won Hong-Jae
Trainer :  Lee Jang-Soo
Team Physician :  Lee Sang-Don

Squad 
Goalkeeper
 Kim Young-Ho,  Kim Kyung-Bum,  Moon Won-Geun
Defender
 Lim Jong-Heon,  Kim Hyun-Seok,  Choi Chung-Il,  Kim Young-Joo,  Jang Chang-Soon,
 Park Jong-Dae,  Yoo Seung-Gwan,  Ko Jeong-Woon,  Park Sang-Rok
Midfielder
 Baek Jong-Chul,  Ha Sung-Jun,  Kim Yong-Se,  Kim I-Ju,  Nam Ho-Sang,
 Oh Dong-Cheon,  Bang In-Woong,  Ahn Ik-Soo,  Na Chi-Seon,  Jung Pyeong-Ryeol
Forward
 Min Byung-Eun,  Han Yeon-Su,  Jang Jeong,  Kim Ki-Wan,  Park Doo-Heung,
 Son Woong-Jung,  Ahn Hyo-Chul,  Kim Jae-So

Season results

KPFL table

Personal awards 

Rookie of the Year Award: Ko Jeong-Woon
Best XI: Lim Jong-Heon

Matches

Notes

Seongnam FC seasons
South Korean football clubs 1989 season